The Belarus Census of 1999 was the first census in Belarus after it became an independent state after the dissolution of the Soviet Union. Previous census data in the territory of Belarus may be found in Soviet Censuses and Russian Empire Census.

See also
Belarus Census (2009)

References

Demographics of Belarus
Census
1999 censuses
Censuses in Belarus